Laryngeal may mean
pertaining to the larynx
in Indo-European linguistics, a consonant postulated in the laryngeal theory 
Laryngeal consonant

See also 
 Laryngealization